Paston may refer to:

People
 Edward Paston (1550–1630), a poet and amateur musician
 George Paston (1860–1936), British author and critic
 Mark Paston (born 1976), New Zealand footballer
 Thomas Paston (died 1550), an English politician
 Paston Baronets, the Earls of Yarmouth
 Paston Coke (born 1971)

Other
 Paston, Norfolk, England
 Paston, Northumberland, England
 Paston, Peterborough, Cambridgeshire
 Paston College in Norfolk
 Paston Letters
 The Paston Treasure

See also
 John Paston (disambiguation)
 William Paston (disambiguation)